Bimbini is a village on the island of Anjouan in the Comoros. According to the 1991 census the village had a population of 1,276. The current estimate for 2009 is 2,247 people.

References

Populated places in Anjouan